Soensanim Bon Yeon is the dharma name and title of  Jane McLaughlin-Dobisz. She is the guiding teacher of the Cambridge Zen Center of the Kwan Um School of Zen in Cambridge, Massachusetts. She received dharma transmission in 2000, and is also a published author and editor of the book The Whole World is a Single Flower by Seungsahn.

Bibliography
The Wisdom of Solitude: A Zen Retreat in the Woods (2004, HarperCollins)
One Hundred Days of Solitude: Losing Myself and Finding Grace on a Zen Retreat (2007, Wisdom Publications)
 The Whole World Is a Single Flower: 365 Kong-Ans for Everyday Life by Seung Sahn (editor, 1992, Tuttle Publishing)

See also
Buddhism in the United States
Timeline of Zen Buddhism in the United States

References

External links
Cambridge Zen Center 
Bon Yeon's 2018 Dharma Talk Practicing with Zen Koans in Your Everyday Life for Tricycle: The Buddhist Review

Zen Buddhism writers
Kwan Um School of Zen
Living people
American Zen Buddhists
Buddhist abbesses
Zen Buddhist nuns
Year of birth missing (living people)